The 2014 Geelong Football Club season is currently the club's 115th season of senior competition in the Australian Football League (AFL). The club also fielded its reserves team in the Victorian Football League (VFL) for the 15th season.

Club personnel

Playing list
 Players are listed in alphabetical order by surname, and statistics are for AFL regular season and finals series matches during the 2014 AFL season only.

Season summary

Pre-season matches

Regular season

Ladder

Finals series

VFL season

Squad

Results

Notes
 Key

 H ^ Home match.
 A ^ Away match.

 Notes
Geelong's scores are indicated in bold font.

References

External links
 Official website of the Geelong Football Club
 Official website of the Australian Football League

2014
Geelong Football Club